Johnny Come Lately is a 1943 drama film directed by William K. Howard starring James Cagney, Grace George, Marjorie Main and Hattie McDaniel. It was the first film produced by Cagney's brother, William Cagney.

The title is derived from the idiom "Johnny Come Lately", which refers to a newcomer who seeks to change an established system. The film centers on a drifter who comes to a new town and is faced with the question of choosing integrity or financial gain.

Plot
In 1906, Tom Richards, a drifter, arrives in the small town of Plattsville. He sits reading a book in the town square when newspaper proprietor Vinnie McLeod speaks to him and offers him help. She goes to meet wealthy mayor Dougherty, a corrupt man who also owns a rival newspaper.

Mrs. McLeod re-encounters Richards in the town courtroom where he is on trial for vagrancy. She offers him a job as a journalist to allow him to escape imprisonment. He starts to shake the place up, and asks to close the paper (the Shield and Banner) for 3 days to redesign and relaunch it, specifically launching an attack on Dougherty.

Meanwhile Dougherty's son is in love with Mrs. McLeod's niece.

Dougherty offers Richards a job paying three times more but he declines due to his morals. Dougherty goes to extreme measures and sends two hired guns to shoot Mrs. McLeod. They hit her in the hand. Richards (who pre-empted the attack and has a gun) chases them off, shooting one.

Mrs. McLeod's niece starts to fall in love with Richards but decides it is young Dougherty she loves.

An eccentric rich woman, nicknamed "Gashouse Mary" (clearly modelled on Mae West) gives funds usually channeled through Dougherty to the orphanage to Richards instead. When she taunts Dougherty she ends up in prison on a bail of $1,500.

Dougherty starts to bend when the entire town parades by holding an effigy of him on a gibbet. Richards and Dougherty Jr. start brawling in the street and Richards is arrested and taken off in a horse-drawn black maria. The townsfolk storm the jail and release him.

In the end Dougherty senior meets with Mrs. McLeod and Richards and agrees to leave town for the sake of his son and her niece. All agree. He also gives back Mrs. McLeod the mortgage on her property. Richards too decides to move on.

Cast

Preservation
Johnny Come Lately was preserved by the Academy Film Archive, in conjunction with the UCLA Film and Television Archive, in 2013.

References

 
 
 
the National Board of Review magazine, Volumes 18-20, page 24

External links

 
 
 
 
 
 

1943 films
American black-and-white films
United Artists films
Films directed by William K. Howard
Films based on American novels
Films based on works by Louis Bromfield
Films set in 1906
1940s historical drama films
American historical drama films
1943 drama films
1940s English-language films
1940s American films